The 12 Hours at the Point was an endurance race for sports cars and sedans hosted by the Washington, D.C. Region of the Sports Car Club of America (SCCA). The initial event was staged in June 1999 at Summit Point Motorsports Park in Summit Point, West Virginia. With the exception of 2006, the race has been held on the weekend closest to June 1. It is the oldest perennial SCCA-sanctioned endurance race.

It was one of three events that comprised the Triple Crown of SCCA amateur endurance racing. The second event in the Triple Crown was The Longest Day of Nelson, held at Nelson Ledges Road Course in Ohio. The final member of the crown was disputed and was either the Charge of the Headlight Brigade, held at Virginia International Raceway in Virginia or the Tropical 12 Hour, held at Homestead-Miami Speedway in Florida.

2009 was the last year the 12 Hours at the Point was conducted.

Overall Winners

Index of Performance Winners

External links
 Official site

Sports car races
Touring car races
Auto races in the United States
Sports Car Club of America
Motorsport in West Virginia